Heliotropium aff. wagneri is an undescribed plant in the family Boraginaceae. It resembles Heliotropium wagneri, but differs in fruits breaking up into four nutlets and flowers that are always yellow, never white.

Endemic to Samhah in Yemen, its natural habitats are subtropical or tropical dry lowland grassland and rocky shores.

References

aff. wagneri
Endemic flora of Socotra
Vulnerable plants
Undescribed plant species
Taxonomy articles created by Polbot